I. Michael Leitman is an American surgeon and medical educator. He is Professor of Surgery and Medical Education and Dean for Graduate Medical Education at the Icahn School of Medicine at Mount Sinai. He previously held the position of Chairman of the Department of Surgery at Mount Sinai Beth Israel in New York City.

Education

A native of Philadelphia, Leitman received both his bachelor's degree and Medical Degree from Boston University. After medical school, Leitman moved to New York City to receive his training in General Surgery at New York Presbyterian-Weill Cornell and completed his fellowship in Surgical Critical Care at North Shore University Hospital-Weill Cornell. While at Cornell, Leitman was under the tutelage of American surgical pioneer G. Tom Shires.

Career

As an innovator of minimally invasive techniques for the treatment of abdominal conditions, Leitman is also known for his research on the outcomes following the surgical treatment of breast cancer, colon cancer, lower gastrointestinal hemorrhage, gallbladder disease and morbid obesity. 
 
For more than 30 years, Dr. Leitman has served as a medical educator. In addition to his current role as Professor of Medical Education at the Icahn School of Medicine at Mount Sinai, Dr. Leitman has also served as a Professor of Clinical Surgery at the Albert Einstein College of Medicine of Yeshiva University in New York City.

Awards and honors

A fellow of the New York Academy of Medicine and the Society of Surgical Oncology, Dr. Leitman has been recognized as a Harold C. Case Scholar and Commonwealth Scholar. Dr. Leitman is also a fellow of the American College of Surgeons, and a member of the American Board of Colon and Rectal Surgery, American Board of Surgery and American Society of Clinical Oncology.

In addition, he was elected to Phi Beta Kappa and Alpha Omega Alpha honor societies. The winner of the 2008 Murry G. Fischer Distinguished Educator Award, in 2013, Dr. Leitman is included in New York Magazine’s (Castle Connolly) lists of "Top Doctors."  In 2022, he was the recipient of the Mount Sinai Faculty Council Lifetime Achievement Award and the Jacobi medallion in 2023.

Publications (partial list)

Lifting the Cap: Bills Seek More Medicare-Supported Residencies

References

External links
Mount Sinai Physician Profile
Icahn School of Medicine Faculty Profile

1950s births
Living people
Icahn School of Medicine at Mount Sinai faculty
Boston University School of Medicine alumni
American medical academics
Physicians from Philadelphia
American surgeons